Wei Gang (born 1960) is a vice admiral in the People's Liberation Army of China. He was an alternate member of the 19th Central Committee of the Chinese Communist Party.

Biography
Wei was born in Penglai County (now Penglai District of Yantai), Shandong, in 1960. 

He served in the North Sea Fleet for a long time and once served as commander of the Lüshun Naval Base and chief of staff of the North Sea Fleet from July 2013 to January 2014. He was appointed deputy commander of the Southern Theater Command in January 2016, concurrently holding the chief of staff position. He became commander of the Eastern Theater Command Navy in January 2017, and served until June 2022.

He attained the rank of vice admiral (zhongjiang) in July 2017.

References

1960 births
Living people
People from Yantai
People's Liberation Army generals from Shandong
People's Republic of China politicians from Shandong
Chinese Communist Party politicians from Shandong
Alternate members of the 19th Central Committee of the Chinese Communist Party